Gilbert Ted Carson (July 8, 1901 – October 27, 1988)  was an American football and basketball coach.  He was the eighth head football coach at Eastern Illinois State Teachers College—now known as Eastern Illinois University—in Charleston, Illinois, serving for five seasons, from 1936 to 1937 and again from 1939 to 1941, and compiling a record if 17–19–3. He married Maxine Powell. Carson was also the head basketball coach at Eastern Illinois from 1936 to 1942, tallying a mark of 36–72.

Head coaching record

Football

See also
 List of college football head coaches with non-consecutive tenure

References

External links
 

1901 births
1988 deaths
Basketball coaches from Illinois
Eastern Illinois Panthers football coaches
Eastern Illinois Panthers men's basketball coaches
People from Wayne County, Illinois